The 2019 African Women's Handball Champions League was the 41st edition, organized by the African Handball Confederation, under the auspices of the International Handball Federation, the handball sport governing body. The tournament was held from October 4–13, 2019 at the Pavilhão Vavá Duarte and Pavilhão Craveiro Lopes in Praia, Cape Verde, contested by 8 teams and won by Clube Desportivo Primeiro de Agosto of Angola.

Draw

Preliminary round

Times given below are in CVT UTC+1.

Group A

* Note:  Advance to semi-finals
* Note:  Advance to quarter-finals

Group B

* Note:  Advance to quarter-finals

Knockout stage

Quarter-finals

Semi-finals

5th place

3rd place

Final

  Stats

Final ranking

See also
 2019 African Women's Handball Cup Winners' Cup
 2018 African Women's Handball Championship

References

External links
 Official website

2019 African Women's Handball Champions League
2019 African Women's Handball Champions League
African Women's Handball Champions League
Handball in Cape Verde